Coyote Mountains Wilderness may refer to:

 Coyote Mountains Wilderness (Arizona)
 Coyote Mountains Wilderness (California)